The 2012–13 Western Carolina Catamounts men's basketball team represented Western Carolina University during the 2012–13 NCAA Division I men's basketball season. The Catamounts, led by eighth year head coach Larry Hunter, played their home games at the Ramsey Center and were members of the North Division of the Southern Conference. They finished the season 14–19, 9–9 in SoCon play to finish in a tie for third place in the North Division. They lost in the quarterfinals of the SoCon tournament to the College of Charleston.

Roster

Schedule

|-
!colspan=9| Regular season

|-
!colspan=9| 2013 Southern Conference men's basketball tournament

References

Western Carolina Catamounts men's basketball seasons
Western Carolina
West
West